Mary Jean Garson  (born 6 November 1953) is an organic chemist and academic in Australia. She currently works for the University of Queensland.

Early life 
Garson was born in Rugby, England, the daughter of an engineer and botanist. She took her B.A with Honours from the University of Cambridge, Newnham College in 1974. Garson's focus was the natural sciences, specializing in chemistry. She obtained an MA in Natural Sciences and she took her PhD in organic chemistry from Cambridge in 1977.

Career 
Garson won a Royal Society postdoctoral fellowship after her PhD, undertaking research in Rome, Italy from 1977–1978. She continued her research at New Hall at Cambridge on a college research fellowship from 1978–1981. She worked as a medicinal chemist from 1981–1983 at Smith Kline and French Research Ltd in Welwyn, England,.

Garson won a Queen Elizabeth II Research Fellowship from James Cook University (1983–1986), based in the Townsville region to research the bioactive organic chemicals in marine organisms. In Townsville, she undertook dive training to study on the Great Barrier Reef. Garson then took a teaching position as the first female academic in chemistry at the University of Wollongong, before moving to the University of Queensland as a lecturer in 1990. She was promoted to Senior Lecturer in 1992 and Reader in 1998. She researches and publishes on the structure, biosynthesis and function of natural products, especially those from marine invertebrates and other microorganisms. She also researches the chemistry of South East Asian medicinal plants.

Garson was promoted to Professor in the School of Chemistry and Molecular Biosciences in 2006, and has served as Deputy Head of the School from 2005–2009.

Awards and honours
2009 – Our Women, Our State (Queensland Government) – Highly Commended
2011 – Leighton Medal of the Royal Australian Chemical Institute, in recognition of her contributions and leadership to the chemistry community, within Australia and overseas.
2013 – Distinguished Woman in Chemistry or Chemical Engineering award of the International Union of Pure and Applied Chemistry
2014 – named as one of "175 Faces of Chemistry" by the Royal Society of Chemistry, UK
2017 – inaugural Margaret Sheil Women in Chemistry Leadership award of the Royal Australian Chemical Institute
2019 – Member of the Order of Australia (AM) in the Australia Day Honours for "significant service to education, particularly to organic chemistry, and as an advocate for women in science".

A species of marine flatworm, discovered at Heron Island, is named for her Maritigrella marygarsonae.

Memberships 
President-Royal Australian Chemical Institute (Queensland Division)
Chair, International Relations Committee of RACI
Member, National Committee for Chemistry
Executive Secretary, World Chemistry Congress/IUPAC General Assembly (2001)
Chair, Board of Australian Science Innovations
Organiser, Chemistry-Biotechnology Symposium at World Chemistry Congress (Torino, 2007); 27th International Symposium on the Chemistry of Natural Products (Brisbane, 2011)
Organiser, Women sharing a Chemical Moment in Time, International Year of Chemistry (2011)
Leadership roles in Division III (organic and biomolecular) of International Union of Pure and Applied Chemistry (IUPAC) as Titular Member (2006-2007), Secretary (2008-2011), President-elect (2012–2013), Division President and Bureau Member (2014–2015), then as Past-President (2016-2017)
Elected to Membership of the Bureau of the International Union of Pure and Applied Chemistry (2018-2021)
 Co-chair IUPAC100 (centennial) Management Committee (2016-2019), and co-convenor of Women's Global Breakfast networking event "Empowering Women in Chemistry" held in over 50 countries on 12 February 2019

References

1953 births
Living people
Australian chemists
Australian women chemists
Organic chemists
Alumni of Newnham College, Cambridge
Academic staff of the University of Queensland
Members of the Order of Australia
English emigrants to Australia